Military Academy of Field Anti-Aircraft Defense named after Marshal of the Soviet Union A.M. Vasilevsky is Russian military academy conducting warrant officer programmes, commissioned officer programmes (specialitet), advance training career commissioned officer programmes (magistratura), and adjunctura programmes. It is located in Smolensk.

History
The Academy was founded in 1970 as Smolensk Higher Anti-Aircraft Artillery School. It was transformed into Military Academy of Anti-Aircraft Defense of Ground Forces by the Presidential Order of 31 March 1992 №146-RP. It was transformed into Military University of Field Anti-Aircraft Defense by the Government Order of 29 August 1998 №1009. Then it was transformed into Military Academy of Field Anti-Aircraft Defense by the Government Order of 9 July 2004 №937-R. It was given the name of Marshal of the Soviet Union Aleksandr Vasilevsky by the Government Order of 11 May 2007 №593-R.

Educational programmes
The Academy prepares anti-aircraft artillery officers for the Ground Forces.

References

External links
 Official website

Military academies of Russia
Military academies of the Soviet Army
Military high schools